The men's Greco-Roman 52 kilograms at the 1992 Summer Olympics as part of the wrestling program were held at the Institut Nacional d'Educació Física de Catalunya from July 26 to July 28. The wrestlers are divided into 2 groups. The winner of each group decided by a double-elimination system. The bronze medal match was scratched and Min Kyung-gab was awarded the bronze medal because Sheldon weighed in over the weight limit.

Results 
Legend
WO — Won by walkover

Elimination A

Round 1

Round 2

Round 3

Round 4

Round 5

Summary

Elimination B

Round 1

Round 2

Round 3 

  was disqualified for failing to make weight before the third round.

Round 4

Summary

Finals

Final standing

References

External links
Official Report

Greco-Roman 52kg